Jackson Alexander Kowar (born October 4, 1996) is an American professional baseball pitcher for the Kansas City Royals of Major League Baseball (MLB).

Amateur career

Kowar was born and raised in Weddington, North Carolina. He attended Charlotte Christian School in Charlotte, North Carolina. He originally signed to play college baseball for Clemson University as a sophomore, but was granted his release following a coaching change. As a senior, he compiled a 10-1 record and 0.20 ERA with 118 strikeouts in 71 innings. He was drafted by the Detroit Tigers in the 40th round of the 2015 Major League Baseball draft but did not sign and instead enrolled at the University of Florida.

As a freshman in 2016, Kowar appeared in 12 games, pitching to a 3-0 record and 3.37 ERA with 44 strikeouts in  innings pitched. His season was ended in May as he was sidelined due to a medical condition not related to baseball. He returned in 2017 and went 12-1, tying Florida's best single-season record in school history, along with posting a 4.08 ERA with 84 strikeouts in 19 games (18 starts). During the 2017 College World Series, Kowar earned the save in the championship game, pitching  scoreless innings, clinching Florida's 2017 national title. In 2018, as a junior, Kowar was named to the All-SEC Second Team. He finished his junior year with a 10-5 record and a 3.04 ERA in 18 starts.

Professional career
Kowar was selected by the Kansas City Royals with the 33rd overall pick in the 2018 Major League Baseball draft, and he signed for $2,147,500. He made his professional debut with the Lexington Legends of the Class A South Atlantic League. In nine starts, he went 0-1 with a 3.42 ERA. Kowar began 2019 with the Wilmington Blue Rocks of the Class A-Advanced Carolina League, with whom he was named an All-Star. After pitching to a 5-3 record with a 3.53 ERA in 13 starts, he was promoted to the Northwest Arkansas Naturals of the Class AA Texas League, with whom he finished the year. Over 13 starts with the Naturals, he went 2-7 with a 3.51 ERA, striking out 78 over  innings.

Kowar did not play in a game in 2020 due to the cancellation of the minor league season because of the COVID-19 pandemic. To begin the 2021 season, he was assigned to the Omaha Storm Chasers of the Triple-A East League. Over six games to begin the year, Kowar logged a 5-0 record and 0.85 ERA with 41 strikeouts in  innings of work.

On June 6, 2021, it was announced that Kowar would be promoted to the major leagues to be the starting pitcher the following day against the Los Angeles Angels. The next day, he was officially selected to the active roster. In his debut, Kowar gave up four earned runs, allowed three hits, walked two batters, and threw three wild pitches before he was removed from the game in the first inning with two outs. In 9 appearances (8 starts) during his rookie campaign, Kowar posted a ghastly 0-6 record and 11.27 ERA with 29 strikeouts in 30.1 innings pitched. In 2022, Kowar struggled between both Omaha and Kansas City. Starting 20 games for the Storm Chasers, he worked to a 4-10 record and 6.16 ERA with 88 strikeouts in 83.1 innings pitched. He limped to a 9.77 ERA with 17 strikeouts in 15.2 innings of work across 7 relief appearances for the big-league club.

Kowar was optioned to Triple-A Omaha to begin the 2023 season.

Personal life 
Kowar's father, Frank Kowar, was a minor league player in the Toronto Blue Jays organization.

References

External links

Florida Gators bio

1996 births
Living people
Baseball players from Charlotte, North Carolina
People from Weddington, North Carolina
Major League Baseball pitchers
Kansas City Royals players
Florida Gators baseball players
Lexington Legends players
Wilmington Blue Rocks players
Northwest Arkansas Naturals players
Omaha Storm Chasers players